Human Soul is an album by the English musician Graham Parker.

The album peaked at No. 165 on the Billboard 200. Parker supported the album by touring with Dave Edmunds's Rock and Roll Revue.

Production
Human Soul was originally divided into "Real" and "Surreal" sides. Pete Thomas, Steve Nieve, and Andrew Bodnar contributed to the album. "Slash and Burn" is about deforestation; "Green Monkeys" is about AIDS. "Soultime" was influenced by ska music.

Critical reception

Rolling Stone called the album "an invigorating jolt—substantial and catchy songs, richly realized." The Chicago Tribune wrote that "Parker explores the soulfulness of his musical roots (the great Stax/Volt R & B records of the '60s) and the soullessness of the era in which he lives." The Calgary Herald noted that "the anger gives his love songs an edge and the man's aware of his own importance in the cosmic scheme of things." 

The Toronto Star concluded that "Human Soul'''s best song is "'Big Man On Paper', a reflective, self- deprecating ballad that finds the expatriate Englishman wandering through a New York state shopping mall and trying, among other things, to make sense of 'the youth in their Whitesnake T-shirts'." The Boston Globe determined that "Parker has synthesized all his best ingredients over the past decade—from the soulfulness of his Howling Wind album and incendiary rock of Squeezing Out Sparks, to the biting politics displayed on his acoustic disc." The Los Angeles Times'' opined that "the production could stand to be sharper and the songs are uneven, but in scope, ambition and self-integration, he's closed out the '80s with what is at least his most interesting album of the decade."

AllMusic wrote that "Parker's music is subtly diverse, adding elements of worldbeat, reggae, pop, and folk to his R&B-fueled rock & roll; however, most of the impact of the music is lost by the slick, radio-ready production."

Track listing

References

Graham Parker albums
1989 albums
RCA Records albums